Michael Joseph Connolly (born April 20, 1947, in Boston, Massachusetts) is a former politician who served as Massachusetts Secretary of the Commonwealth from 1979 to 1994.

An attorney by profession, Connolly was first elected to public office in 1973 when he won a seat in the Massachusetts House of Representatives.

He was a candidate for the Democratic nomination for Edward Brooke's United States Senate seat in 1978,  but he dropped out of the race and instead ran for and was elected Secretary of the Commonwealth. Connolly ran for the Senate again in 1984, losing the nomination to Lieutenant Governor John Kerry.

Connolly is currently involved in real estate development.

Family
Connolly is married to Lynda M. Connolly, former Chief Justice of the Dedham District Court. They have four children, including former Boston City Council member John R. Connolly.

References

Democratic Party members of the Massachusetts House of Representatives
Politicians from Boston
Boston Latin School alumni
College of the Holy Cross alumni
New England Law Boston alumni
1947 births
Living people
People from Roslindale